The 2020 Oregon State Treasurer election was held on November 3, 2020, to elect the Oregon State Treasurer. Incumbent Democratic State Treasurer Tobias Read, first elected in 2016, was reelected to a second term in office.

Democratic primary

Candidates

Declared
 Tobias Read, incumbent State Treasurer

Results

Republican primary

Candidates

Declared
Jeff Gudman, former Lake Oswego city councilor

Endorsements

Results

General election

Results

References 

State treasurers of Oregon
State Treasurer
Oregon state treasurer elections
Pennsylvania